Charles James Matthew Stirling  FRS, CChem, FRSC (born 1930) is an Emeritus Professor of Chemistry, at the University of Sheffield, in England.

Stirling was born on 8 December 1930 to Brigadier Alexander Dickson Stirling and his wife  Millicent Stirling

He was made a Fellow of the Royal Society of Chemistry in 1967, and a Fellow of the Royal Society in 1986; and gave the Royal Institution Christmas Lectures in 1992.

The Royal Society describe him as having "made important contributions to physical organic chemistry through his elucidation of organic reaction mechanisms".

References

External links 

 
 

Fellows of the Royal Society of Chemistry
Academics of the University of Sheffield
Fellows of the Royal Society
Living people
Place of birth missing (living people)
20th-century British chemists
21st-century British chemists
1930 births